Mawlanā Syed Muntakhab al-Ḥaqq (Urdu: منتخب الحق) was the dean of the faculty of Islamic studies at the University of Karachi, Pakistan, from 1964 to 1972. He was named a jurisconsult to the Federal Shariat Court in 1981, and appointed to the Council of Islamic Ideology in 1982.

References

Muhajir people
Hanafi fiqh scholars
Indian Sunni Muslim scholars of Islam